Col Nolan was an Australian jazz organ and piano player. He was nominated for the 1997 ARIA Award for Best Jazz Album with Nolan's Groove, recorded with David Seidel on bass and Laurie Bennett on drums along with guest musicians. The Nolan-Buddle Quartet's (Nolan, Errol Buddle, Dieter Vogt and Warren Daly) 1976 single release of the theme from Picnic at Hanging Rock charted in the Australian top 40.

Discography

Albums

Singles

Awards and nominations

ARIA Music Awards
The ARIA Music Awards is an annual awards ceremony that recognises excellence, innovation, and achievement across all genres of Australian music. They commenced in 1987. 

! 
|-
| 1997
| Nolans Groove
| Best Jazz Album
| 
| 
|-

References

Australian musicians
Living people
1938 births